Antoine Godeau (24 September 1605, in Dreux – 21 April 1672, in Vence) was a French bishop, poet and exegete. He is now known for his work of criticism Discours de la poésie chrétienne from 1633.

Biography

His verse-writing early won the interest of a relative in Paris, Valentin Conrart, at whose house the literary world gathered. The outcome of these meetings was the foundation of the Académie française, of which Godeau was one of the first members and the third whose lot it fell to deliver the weekly address to that body.

He was induced to settle in Paris, where he soon became a favorite at the Hôtel de Rambouillet, rivalling the famous writers of his period. At that time, to say of any work c'est de Godeau was to stamp it with the seal of approval. Perhaps best known among the works of his early days is his Discours sur les œuvres de Malherbe (1629), which shows some critical power and is valuable for the history of the French prose of the seventeenth century.

Ordained priest in Paris on May 7, 1636, he was named on June 21 Bishop of Grasse by Richelieu, to whom he had dedicated his first religious composition, a poetical paraphrase of the Psalm Benedicite omnia opera Domini. He proved a model prelate. By a Bull of Pope Innocent X he was empowered to unite the Dioceses of Grasse and Vence under his administration, but seeing the dissatisfaction of the clergy of the latter diocese, he relinquished the former in 1653 and established himself at Vence.

Godeau by no means gave up other interests. In 1645 and 1655 he took a prominent part in the General Assembly of the French Clergy, and under the regency of Anne of Austria was deputy from the Estates of Provence. He was stricken with apoplexy and died in his episcopal city at the age of sixty-seven.

Works

He turned his talent for versification to religious uses, his best known productions being a metrical version of the Psalms, poems on St. Paul, the assumption, St. Eustace, Mary Magdalen, and one of 15,000 lines on the annals of the Church. The monotony and mechanical arrangement of the poems are relieved at intervals by passages remarkable for thought or expression, among others those lines embodied by Corneille in his Polyeucte:

Leur glore tombe par terre,

Et comme elle a l'éclat du verre,

Elle en a la fragilité. 

The Jesuit poet François Vavasseur (1605-1681) published, in 1647, a satire on Godeau, Antonius Godellus, episcopus Grassensis, the verdict of which was echoed by Boileau in a letter to Maucroix.

His Eloges des evesques, qui dans tous les siècles de l'Eglise ont fleury en doctrine et en sainteté (Paris, 1665) was republished in 1802 by M. Sauffret. His Histoire de l'Eglise (Paris, 1633) was translated into Italian by Sperone Speroni and into German by Hyper and Groote (Augsburg, 1768–96), and is still cited. Of this work Johann Baptist Alzog says that "although written in an attractive and popular style, it is lacking in solid worth and original research" (Manual of Universal History, I, Dublin, 1900, 33). It is related that during the publication of this work the author chanced one day in a library to engage in conversation with the Oratorian, Père Le Cointe, who, ignorant of Godeau's identity, indicated some grave defects in the volumes which had already appeared, criticisms of which the author availed himself in correcting the work for a new edition. The same Père Le Cointe, later a staunch friend of Godeau's, while conceding to the complete work many excellencies, calls attention to its frequent inaccuracies and lack of critical balance. Minor writings of Godeau's include L'Idée du bon magistrat en la vie et en la mort de Mr de Cordes, conseiller au Chastelet de Paris (1645) and Eloges historiques des empereurs, des roys, des princes..... qui dans tous les Siècles ont excellé en piété (1667).

Among Godeau's works of a religious character are: Prières, méditations (Paris, 1643); Avis à Messieurs de Paris pour le culte du Saint Sacrement dans les Paroisses, & de la façon de le porter aux malades (1644); Ordonnances et Instructions synodales (1644); Vie de Saint Paul Apôtre (1647); La vie de saint Augustin (1652); La panégyrique de saint Augustin (1653); La vie de saint Charles Borromée (1657); Eloge de Saint François de Sales (1663). His chief title to fame, however, rests on his work in Holy Scripture. His paraphrases of the following books: Romans (Paris, 1635); Corinthians, Galatians, and Ephesians (1632); Thessalonians, Timothy, Titus, and Philemon (1641); Hebrews (1637); the Canonical Epistles (1640), are still recommended and useful, the sense and connexion of ideas being brought out clearly by the insertion of the fewest possible words (Simon in Hist. Critique des principaux commentateurs du N.T., c. lvii). His Version expliquée du Nouveau Testament de Nostre Seigneur Jésus-Christ (1668) is something between a literal translation and a paraphrase. The greatest of all his works, according to Nicéron, is La morale chrétienne pour l'instruction des Curez et des Prêtres du diocèse de Vence (Paris, 1709), intended to combat the Casuists, a model of force, clearness, and revealing a precision rarely to be found in the other writings of the same author. In the Latin translation, which appeared at Augsburg in 1774 under the title Theologia moralis ex purissimis s. Scripturæ, patrum ac conciliorum fontibus derivata, notis theologicis illustrata, the arrangement of the matter is greatly improved.

See also
 Hercule Audiffret

References

Attribution

Further reading
Dupin, Louis Ellies, Bibliothèque des auteurs ecclésiastiques du XVIIe siècle (1719)
Jauffret, Gaspard-Jean-André-Joseph, Vie de Godeau in Eloges des évêques français qui se sont rendus les plus illustres par leur doctrine et leur sainteté, (Metz, 1802)
Kerviler, René, Antoine Godeau, évêque de Grasse et de Vence (Paris: H. Champion 1879).
Nicéron, Jean-Pierre, Mémoires pour servir à l'histoire (Paris, 1743), 1295, 314, 896.
Racine, Bonaventure (Abbé), Abrégé de l'histoire ecclésiastique (1748–56), XIII, Utrecht (1748-1756)
Simon, Richard (Prêtre), Histoire critique du texte du Nouveau Testament: où l'on établit la Vérité sur lesquels les Actes de la Religion Chrêtienne est fondée (1689)
Speroni, Sperone, Vita de A. Godeau, vescovo di Vence (Venice, 1761)

External links
 Fauteuil 10 (PDF)
 

1605 births
1672 deaths
Writers from Dreux
French poets
Members of the Académie Française
Bishops of Grasse
Bishops of Vence
17th-century French writers
17th-century French male writers
French male poets